Dan Neville (born 8 December 1946) is a former Irish Fine Gael politician who served as Chairman of the Fine Gael Parliamentary Party from 2014 to 2016. He served as a Teachta Dála (TD) from 1997 to 2016. He was a Senator for the Labour Panel from 1989 to 1997.

He was a member of Limerick County Council from 1985 to 2003. Due to the abolition of the dual mandate Neville stepped down from Limerick County Council, he was replaced by his son Tom Neville. Neville first stood as a candidate for Dáil Éireann at the 1987 general election, when he failed to win a seat. He did not contest the 1989 general election, but at the subsequent Seanad election he won a seat on the Labour Panel. He was unsuccessful again at the 1992 general election, but was re-elected at the 1993 election to the 20th Seanad.

He finally won a seat in the Dáil at the 1997 general election. He retained his seat at the 2002 and 2007 general elections. In the 2011 general election, he was elected for the Limerick constituency. He is president of the Irish Association of Suicidology. He was party Deputy Spokesperson on Health, with special responsibility for Mental Health from 2010 to 2011.

He was Chairman of the Fine Gael Parliamentary Party from May 2014 to June 2016.

On 11 August 2015, he announced that he would not contest the 2016 general election.

References

1946 births
Living people
Alumni of University College Cork
Fine Gael TDs
Local councillors in County Limerick
Irish people of Norman descent
Members of the 19th Seanad
Members of the 20th Seanad
Members of the 28th Dáil
Members of the 29th Dáil
Members of the 30th Dáil
Members of the 31st Dáil
Fine Gael senators